Zillur Rahman Champak (born 1967) is a Bangladeshi chess player who received the FIDE title of International Master (IM) in 1990. He won back-to-back national titles in 1986 and 1987.

Career
Rahman earned the International Master title in 1990. All of his IM qualifying norms were obtained at tournaments held in Dhaka.

He has represented Bangladesh in several Chess Olympiads, from 1980 to 2000.

References

External links
 
 
 
 
 Zillur Rahman at Chessmetrics

1967 births
Living people
Bangladeshi chess players
Chess Olympiad competitors
Chess International Masters